A quickdraw (also known as an extender) is a piece of climbing equipment used by rock and ice climbers to allow the climbing rope to run freely through protection such as a bolt anchors or other  traditional gear  while leading.

A quickdraw consists of two carabiners connected by a semi-rigid material (sometimes called the "dogbone"). One carabiner has a straight gate and connects to an anchoring device. The other carabiner is for the climbing rope, and uses a bent gate. Quickdraws are manufactured with either a solid carabiner gate or a wire carabiner gate for its lighter weight.

Use
A quickdraw is a specific type of runner. 
Runners are used by rock and ice climbers to extend the distance between an anchoring device and the rope.

A quickdraw is differentiated from a simple open loop of webbing with 2 carabiners on it by the following attributes:

 The material that connects the 2 carabiners is semi-rigid. It is not as flexible as an open loop of webbing. This rigidity facilitates quicker clipping to an anchoring device.
 The gate (on the carabiner that clips to a rope) is held in a specific orientation that facilitates quicker clipping to a rope.

These two attributes differentiate a quickdraw from other types of runners. These two attributes are literally what makes this special type of runner "quick" to "draw".
If either of these two elements is missing the runner is not a "quickdraw".

The methods by which a quickdraw maintains gate orientation vary. The most popular method involves the use of an elastic polymer band around the outside of the point of connection between the carabiner and the semi-rigid material.  The elastic band should only be installed on the rope-end, and not on the anchor end.  The elastic band is not a load-bearing element, and the carabiner must pass through the dogbone to hold body weight.  Incorrect assembly has led to at least one death.

While historically the orientation of the gates varied, it is now generally recommended that both gates face the same direction, and that the quickdraw is clipped with both gates facing away from the climber's path. This lessens the chances of the carabiner getting "nose-hooked" and breaking, or of either carabiner unclipping, during a fall or due to rope drag.

Permadraw

A permadraw is a quickdraw that is made from steel cable that has steel carabiners and remains permanently attached to the bolts.  Developed in places such as Rifle Mountain Park in Colorado as a safer alternative; steel is much harder-wearing than the aluminum used in normal quickdraws.  In addition, unlike quickdraws, climbers don't need to retrieve the permadraws at the end of a climb.

References

External links 
 How to select Quickdraws for Climbing

Climbing equipment